She Had to Choose is a 1934 American film directed by Ralph Ceder. A romantic comedy/ crime drama, it is set in California during The Depression.

Plot 
Sally Bates (Isabel Jewell) leaves Texas, headed for Hollywood, in the 1930s. She is tempted to take a job as a mechanic, with Pop (Arthur Stone), on the highway, but presses on in to town.

She's going to sleep in her old "Tin Lizzie". But after she saves Bill's neck (Buster Crabbe) with her old six-shooter during a botched hold-up, Bill takes her home to live with his mom (Maidel Turner), and gives her a job at his drive-in restaurant.

Sally's friendly and easy going manner is very popular with the customers, but Bill gets jealous when Jack (Regis Toomey), the reckless younger brother of his well-to-do girlfriend Clara (Sally Blane), starts paying Sally attention, following her around in his roadster.

Sally is so humiliated when Clara rips off the dress Jack gave her, at a nightclub, she ends up at his hotel room, married to Jack, after an ill-conceived night of drinking.

Bill arrives in the morning to confront the drunken Jack and take Sally home, but Jack trips and smashes his head, killing himself. Bill is under investigation for murder of the wealthy socialite.

Cast 
Buster Crabbe as Bill Cutler
Isabel Jewell as Sally Bates
Sally Blane as Clara Berry
Regis Toomey as Jack Berry
Maidel Turner as Mrs. Cutler
Fuzzy Knight as Wally
Arthur Stone as Pop
Edward Gargan as Higgins
Huntley Gordon as Attorney
Wallis Clark as District Attorney
Kenneth Howell as Announcer
Eddie Fetherston as Hold-Up Man
Max Wagner as Hold-Up Man

References

External links 

1934 films
1930s crime comedy-drama films
1930s romantic comedy-drama films
American black-and-white films
Films directed by Ralph Ceder
American romantic comedy-drama films
American crime comedy-drama films
Majestic Pictures films
1930s English-language films
1930s American films
Romantic crime films